Ameer Uddin is an Indian politician and a member of the 8th Legislative Assembly of Uttar Pradesh who represented Chandpur (Assembly constituency) for the party of Indian National Congress (U), in office from June 1980 to March 1985.

References 

Uttar Pradesh MLAs 1980–1985
People from Bijnor district
Living people
Year of birth missing (living people)
Indian National Congress (U) politicians
Indian National Congress politicians from Uttar Pradesh